Aioli, allioli or aïoli ( or ; Provençal   or aiòli  ;) is a cold sauce consisting of an emulsion of garlic and olive oil; it is found in the cuisines of the northwest Mediterranean, from Andalusia to Calabria. 

The names mean "garlic and oil" in Catalan and Provençal. It is found in the cuisines of the Mediterranean coasts of Spain (Catalonia, the Valencian Community, the Balearic Islands, Murcia, and eastern Andalusia), France (Provence), Italy (Sicily and Calabria), and Malta. 

Some versions of the sauce are closer to a garlic mayonnaise, incorporating egg yolks and lemon juice, whereas other versions lack egg yolk and contain more garlic. The latter gives the sauce a pastier texture, making it more laborious to produce as the emulsion is harder to stabilize. There are many variations, such as adding lemon juice or other seasonings. In France, it may include mustard. In Malta, arjoli or ajjoli is commonly made with the addition of either crushed galletti (a type of cracker) or tomato.

Like mayonnaise, aioli is an emulsion or suspension of small globules of oil and oil-soluble compounds in water and water-soluble compounds. In Spain, purists believe aioli should not include egg, but in France and elsewhere, egg or egg yolk is the usual emulsifier.

Since about 1990, it has become common in the United States to call all flavored mayonnaises aioli. Purists insist that flavored mayonnaise can contain garlic, but true aioli contains garlic and no other seasoning (except salt).

Etymology
The word is a transparent compound of the words meaning "garlic" and "oil." 

The English spelling comes from the French aïoli, which itself comes from Occitan. The spelling in Occitan may be alhòli, following the classical norm, or aiòli, following the Mistralian norm. In Catalan it is spelled allioli. The most common term in Spanish is alioli, an adaptation from Catalan, although it is also called ajoaceite, ajiaceite, ajolio or ajaceite. It is also spelt alioli in Galician.

Basic recipe

Garlic is crushed in a mortar and pestle and emulsified with salt and olive oil.

Today, aioli is often made in a food processor or blender, but some traditionalists object that this does not give the same result.

Serving
 

In Occitan cuisine, aioli is typically served with seafood, fish soup, and croutons. An example is a dish called merluça amb alhòli.

In the Occitan Valleys of Italy it is served with potatoes boiled with salt and bay laurel.

In Provençal cuisine, aioli or, more formally, le grand aïoli, aioli garni, or aïoli monstre is a dish consisting of various boiled vegetables (usually  carrots, potatoes, artichokes, and green beans), poached fish (normally soaked salt cod), snails, canned tuna, other seafood, and boiled eggs, all served with aioli. This dish is often served during the festivities on the feast days of the patron saint of Provençal villages and towns. It is traditional to serve it with snails for Christmas Eve and with cod on Ash Wednesday. Aïoli is so strongly associated with Provence that when the poet Frédéric Mistral started a regionalist Provençal-language newspaper in 1891, he called it L'Aiòli.

The Provençal cuisine fish soup bourride is generally served with aioli.

In Spain, particularly in Catalan cuisine and Valencian cuisine, allioli is often served with arròs negre, arròs a banda, fideuà, with grilled snails (cargols a la llauna), grilled meat, lamb, rabbit, vegetables, boiled cod (bacallà a la catalana, bacallà amb patates) and comes in other varieties such as allioli de codony (allioli with boiled quince, not the preserve) or allioli with boiled pear. Other commonly used vegetables are beets, fennel, celery, zucchini, cauliflower, chickpeas, and raw tomato.

See also

References

Catalan cuisine
Cuisine of Provence
French cuisine
Garlic dishes
Italian cuisine
Macedonian cuisine
Maltese cuisine
Mayonnaise
Spanish cuisine
Tapas